Abram Svyadoshch (1914–1997) was a Soviet psychiatrist and sexologist.

Publications 
Психотерапия: пособие для врачей. — СПб.: Питер, 2000. — 288 с. — (Современная медицина). — 5000 экз. — 
Сексопатология. Ситуационные задачи (в соавторстве с М. В. Екимовым)
Женская сексопатология. Москва: Медицина, 1974.
Неврозы. Руководство для врачей

1914 births
1997 deaths
Soviet sexologists
Soviet psychiatrists